Yuvasena is a 2004 Indian Telugu-language film directed by Jayaraj and starring Bharath, Sarvanand, Kishore, Padma Kumar,  Suresh Menon, and Gopika. The film is a remake of Jayaraj's own Malayalam film 4 the People (2004).

Cast 

Bharath as Vivek
Sarvanand as Aravind
Kishore as Siva
Padma Kumar as Rafi
Narain as Sharat Chandra (credited as Suresh Menon)
Gopika 
Revathi
Madhuri
Jeeva as a police officer
Narra Venkateswara Rao as a minister
Jr. Relangi
Melkote as a professor
 Sekhar (special appearance in the song "Vonee Vesukunna")
 Jani Master (special appearance in the song "Vonee Vesukunna")

Production 
After the success of  the Malayalam film 4 the People, Jayaraj remade the film in Telugu with Sravanthi Ravi Kishore as the producer. The film retains much of the cast of the original film. This film marks the film debut of lyricist Ramajogayya Sastry and cinematographer Guna. This film marks the entry of Bharath into Telugu cinema after the success of the dubbed Telugu version of Boys (2003). It also marks the Telugu debut of Jayaraj, Gopika, and Jassie Gift. Malayalam actor Narain was credited as Suresh Menon in the film.

Soundtrack 

The songs were reused from the original film 4 the People.

Release 
The film released on 4 November, coinciding with Diwali. Unlike the original, the film was a box office failure, but did not lose money due to the film's shoestring budget.

Gudipoodi Srihari of The Hindu compared the film with Tagore. Jeevi of Idlebrain.com said that "The plus points are music and modern taking. Minus points are predictability in story and no surprise/shocking elements". A critic from Full Hyderabad wrote that "Jassie Gift's music is the only point of the movie worth sitting up for".

References

External links
 

2000s Malayalam-language films
2000s vigilante films
2004 action films
2004 films
Indian action films
Indian vigilante films
Telugu remakes of Malayalam films